12th Anniversary Show was the 12th ROH Anniversary Show professional wrestling event produced by Ring of Honor (ROH), which took place on February 21, 2014, at the Pennsylvania National Guard Armory in Philadelphia, Pennsylvania

Background
12th Anniversary Show featured nine professional wrestling matches, which involved different wrestlers from pre-existing scripted feuds, plots, and storylines that played out on ROH's television programs. Wrestlers portrayed villains or heroes as they followed a series of events that built tension and culminated in a wrestling match or series of matches.

Results

References

2014 in professional wrestling
12
2014 in Pennsylvania
Events in Philadelphia
Professional wrestling in Philadelphia